Lubodino is a rural locality (a village) in Vorobyovskoye Rural Settlement, Sokolsky District, Vologda Oblast, Russia. The population was 22 as of 2002.

Geography 
Lubodino is located 64 km northeast of Sokol (the district's administrative centre) by road. Novoye is the nearest rural locality.

References 

Rural localities in Sokolsky District, Vologda Oblast